Margaret Eleanor Atwood  (born November 18, 1939) is a Canadian poet, novelist, literary critic, essayist, teacher, environmental activist, and inventor. Since 1961, she has published eighteen books of poetry, eighteen novels, eleven books of non-fiction, nine collections of short fiction, eight children's books, two graphic novels, and a number of small press editions of both poetry and fiction. Atwood has won numerous awards and honors for her writing, including two Booker Prizes, the Arthur C. Clarke Award, the Governor General's Award, the Franz Kafka Prize, Princess of Asturias Awards, and the National Book Critics and PEN Center USA Lifetime Achievement Awards. A number of her works have been adapted for film and television.

Atwood's works encompass a variety of themes including gender and identity, religion and myth, the power of language, climate change, and "power politics". Many of her poems are inspired by myths and fairy tales which interested her from a very early age.

Atwood is a founder of the Griffin Poetry Prize and the Writers' Trust of Canada. She is also a Senior Fellow of Massey College, Toronto. She is the inventor of the LongPen device and associated technologies that facilitate remote robotic writing of documents.

Early life and education 
Atwood was born in Ottawa, Ontario, Canada, the second of three children of Carl Edmund Atwood, an entomologist, and Margaret Dorothy (née Killam), a former dietitian and nutritionist from Woodville, Nova Scotia. Because of her father's research in forest entomology, Atwood spent much of her childhood in the backwoods of northern Quebec, and travelling back and forth between Ottawa, Sault Ste. Marie and Toronto.

She did not attend school full-time until she was 12 years old. She became a voracious reader of literature, Dell pocketbook mysteries, Grimms' Fairy Tales, Canadian animal stories, and comic books. She attended Leaside High School in Leaside, Toronto, and graduated in 1957. Atwood began writing plays and poems at the age of 6.

As a child, she also participated in the Brownie program of Girl Guides of Canada. Atwood has written about her experiences in Girl Guides in several of her publications.

Atwood realized she wanted to write professionally when she was 16. In 1957, she began studying at Victoria College in the University of Toronto, where she published poems and articles in Acta Victoriana, the college literary journal, and participated in the sophomore theatrical tradition of The Bob Comedy Revue. Her professors included Jay Macpherson and Northrop Frye. She graduated in 1961 with a Bachelor of Arts in English (honours) and minors in philosophy and French.

In 1961, Atwood began graduate studies at Radcliffe College of Harvard University, with a Woodrow Wilson fellowship. She obtained a master's degree (MA) from Radcliffe in 1962 and pursued doctoral studies for two years, but did not finish her dissertation, The English Metaphysical Romance.

Personal life
Atwood has a sister, Ruth Atwood, born in 1951, and a brother who is two years older, Harold Leslie Atwood. She has claimed that, according to her grandmother (maiden name Webster) the 17th-century witchcraft-lynching survivor Mary Webster might have been an ancestor: '"On Monday, my grandmother would say Mary was her ancestor, and on Wednesday she would say she wasn’t ... So take your pick."' Webster is the subject of Atwood's poem "Half-Hanged Mary", as well as the subject of Atwood's dedication in her novel The Handmaid's Tale (1985).

Atwood married Jim Polk, an American writer, in 1968, but divorced in 1973. She formed a relationship with fellow novelist Graeme Gibson soon afterward and moved to a farm near Alliston, Ontario, where their daughter, Eleanor Jess Atwood Gibson, was born in 1976.

The family returned to Toronto in 1980. Atwood and Gibson were together until September 18, 2019, when Gibson died after suffering from dementia. She wrote about Gibson in the poem Dearly and in an accompanying essay on grief and poetry published in The Guardian in 2020. Atwood said about Gibson "He wasn't an egotist, so he wasn't threatened by anything I was doing. He said to our daughter towards the end of his life, 'Your mum would still have been a writer if she hadn't met me, but she wouldn't have had as much fun'".

Although she is an accomplished writer, Atwood says that she is "a terrible speller" who writes both on a computer and by hand.

Career

1960s 
Atwood's first book of poetry, Double Persephone, was published as a pamphlet by Hawkshead Press in 1961, winning the E.J. Pratt Medal. While continuing to write, Atwood was a lecturer in English at the University of British Columbia, Vancouver, from 1964 to 1965, Instructor in English at the Sir George Williams University in Montreal from 1967 to 1968, and taught at the University of Alberta from 1969 to 1970. In 1966, The Circle Game was published, winning the Governor General's Award. This collection was followed by three other small press collections of poetry: Kaleidoscopes Baroque: a poem, Cranbrook Academy of Art (1965); Talismans for Children, Cranbrook Academy of Art (1965); and Speeches for Doctor Frankenstein, Cranbrook Academy of Art (1966); as well as, The Animals in That Country (1968). Atwood's first novel, The Edible Woman, was published in 1969. As a social satire of North American consumerism, many critics have often cited the novel as an early example of the feminist concerns found in many of Atwood's works.

1970s 
Atwood taught at York University in Toronto from 1971 to 1972 and was a writer in residence at the University of Toronto during the 1972/1973 academic year. Atwood published six collections of poetry over the course of the decade: The Journals of Susanna Moodie (1970), Procedures for Underground (1970), Power Politics (1971), You Are Happy (1974), Selected Poems 1965–1975 (1976), and Two-Headed Poems (1978). Atwood also published three novels during this time: Surfacing (1972); Lady Oracle (1976); and Life Before Man (1979), which was a finalist for the Governor General's Award. Surfacing, Lady Oracle, and Life Before Man, like The Edible Woman, explore identity and social constructions of gender as they relate to topics such as nationhood and sexual politics. In particular, Surfacing, along with her first non-fiction monograph, Survival: A Thematic Guide to Canadian Literature (1972), helped establish Atwood as an important and emerging voice in Canadian literature. In 1977 Atwood published her first short story collection, Dancing Girls, which was the winner of the St. Lawrence Award for Fiction and the award of The Periodical Distributors of Canada for Short Fiction.

By 1976, there was such interest in Atwood, her works, and her life that Maclean's declared her to be "Canada's most gossiped-about writer."

1980s 
Atwood's literary reputation continued to rise in the 1980s with the publication of Bodily Harm (1981); The Handmaid's Tale (1985), winner of the Arthur C. Clarke Award and 1985 Governor General's Award and finalist for the 1986 Booker Prize; and Cat's Eye (1988), finalist for both the 1988 Governor General's Award and the 1989 Booker Prize. Despite her distaste for literary labels, Atwood has since conceded to referring to The Handmaid's Tale as a work of science fiction or, more accurately, speculative fiction. As she has repeatedly noted, "There's a precedent in real life for everything in the book. I decided not to put anything in that somebody somewhere hadn't already done."

While reviewers and critics have been tempted to read autobiographical elements of Atwood's life in her work, particularly Cat's Eye, in general Atwood resists the desire of critics to read too closely for an author's life in their writing. Filmmaker Michael Rubbo's Margaret Atwood: Once in August (1984) details the filmmaker's frustration in uncovering autobiographical evidence and inspiration in Atwood's works.

During the 1980s, Atwood continued to teach, serving as the MFA Honorary Chair the University of Alabama in Tuscaloosa, 1985; the Berg Professor of English, New York University, 1986; Writer-in-Residence, Macquarie University, Australia, 1987; and Writer-in-Residence, Trinity University, San Antonio, Texas, 1989. Regarding her stints with teaching, she has noted, "Success for me meant no longer having to teach at university."

1990s 
Atwood's reputation as a writer continued to grow with the publication of the novels The Robber Bride (1993), finalist for the 1994 Governor General's Award and shortlisted for the James Tiptree Jr. Award, and Alias Grace (1996), winner of the 1996 Giller Prize, finalist for the 1996 Booker Prize, finalist for the 1996 Governor General's Award, and shortlisted for the 1997 Orange Prize for Fiction. Although vastly different in context and form, both novels use female characters to question good and evil and morality through their portrayal of female villains. As Atwood noted about The Robber Bride, "I'm not making a case for evil behavior, but unless you have some women characters portrayed as evil characters, you're not playing with a full range." The Robber Bride takes place in contemporary Toronto, while Alias Grace is a work of historical fiction detailing the 1843 murders of Thomas Kinnear and his housekeeper Nancy Montgomery. Atwood had previously written the 1974 CBC made-for-TV film The Servant Girl, about the life of Grace Marks, the young servant who, along with James McDermott, was convicted of the crime. Atwood continued her poetry contributions by publishing Snake Woman in 1999 for the Women's Literature journal Kalliope.

2000s

Novels 

In 2000, Atwood published her tenth novel, The Blind Assassin, to critical acclaim, winning both the Booker Prize and the Hammett Prize in 2000. The Blind Assassin was also nominated for the Governor General's Award in 2000, Orange Prize for Fiction, and the International Dublin Literary Award in 2002. In 2001, Atwood was inducted into Canada's Walk of Fame.

Atwood followed this success with the publication of Oryx and Crake in 2003, the first novel in a series that also includes The Year of the Flood (2009) and MaddAddam (2013), which would collectively come to be known as the MaddAddam Trilogy. The apocalyptic vision in the MaddAddam Trilogy engages themes of genetic modification, pharmaceutical and corporate control, and man-made disaster. As a work of speculative fiction, Atwood notes of the technology in Oryx and Crake, "I think, for the first time in human history, we see where we might go. We can see far enough into the future to know that we can't go on the way we've been going forever without inventing, possibly, a lot of new and different things." She later cautions in the acknowledgements to MaddAddam, "Although MaddAddam is a work of fiction, it does not include any technologies or bio-beings that do not already exist, are not under construction or are not possible in theory."

In 2005, Atwood published the novella The Penelopiad as part of the Canongate Myth Series. The story is a retelling of The Odyssey from the perspective of Penelope and a chorus of the twelve maids murdered at the end of the original tale. The Penelopiad was given a theatrical production in 2007.

In 2016, Atwood published the novel Hag-Seed, a modern-day retelling of Shakespeare's The Tempest, as part of Penguin Random House's Hogarth Shakespeare Series.

On November 28, 2018, Atwood announced that she would publish The Testaments, a sequel to The Handmaid's Tale, in September 2019. The novel features three female narrators and takes place fifteen years after the character Offred's final scene in The Handmaid's Tale. The book was announced as the joint winner of the 2019 Booker Prize on October 14, 2019.

Non-fiction 
In 2008, Atwood published Payback: Debt and the Shadow Side of Wealth, a collection of five lectures delivered as part of the Massey Lectures from October 12 to November 1, 2008. The book was released in anticipation of the lectures, which were also recorded and broadcast on CBC Radio One's Ideas.

Chamber opera
In March 2008, Atwood accepted a chamber opera commission. Commissioned by City Opera of Vancouver, Pauline is set in Vancouver in March 1913 during the final days of the life of Canadian writer and performer Pauline Johnson. Pauline, composed by Tobin Stokes with libretto by Atwood, premiered on May 23, 2014, at Vancouver's York Theatre.

Graphic fiction 
In 2016, Atwood began writing the superhero comic book series Angel Catbird, with co-creator and illustrator Johnnie Christmas. The series protagonist, scientist Strig Feleedus, is victim of an accidental mutation that leaves him with the body parts and powers of both a cat and a bird. As with her other works, Atwood notes of the series, "The kind of speculative fiction about the future that I write is always based on things that are in process right now. So it's not that I imagine them, it's that I notice that people are working on them and I take it a few steps further down the road. So it doesn't come out of nowhere, it comes out of real life."

Future Library project 
With her novel Scribbler Moon, Atwood is the first contributor to the Future Library project. The work, completed in 2015, was ceremonially handed over to the project on May 27 of the same year. The book will be held by the project until its eventual publishing in 2114. She thinks that readers will probably need a paleo-anthropologist to translate some parts of her story. In an interview with the Guardian newspaper, Atwood said, "There's something magical about it. It's like Sleeping Beauty. The texts are going to slumber for 100 years and then they'll wake up, come to life again. It's a fairytale length of time. She slept for 100 years."

Invention of the LongPen
In early 2004, while on the paperback tour in Denver for her novel Oryx and Crake, Atwood conceived the concept of a remote robotic writing technology, what would later be known as the LongPen, that would enable a person to remotely write in ink anywhere in the world via tablet PC and the Internet, thus allowing her to conduct her book tours without being physically present. She quickly founded a company, Unotchit Inc., to develop, produce and distribute this technology. By 2011, the company shifted its market focus into business and legal transactions and was producing a range of products, for a variety of remote writing applications, based on the LongPen technologies. In 2013, the company renamed itself to Syngrafii Inc. In 2021, it is cloud based and offers Electronic signature-technology. As of May 2021, Atwood is still co-founder and a director of Syngrafii Inc. and holder of various patents related to the LongPen and related technology.

Poetry 
In November 2020 Atwood published Dearly, a collection of poems exploring absences and endings, ageing and retrospection, and gifts and renewals.  The central poem, Dearly, was also published in The Guardian newspaper along with an essay exploring the passing of time, grief, and how a poem belongs to the reader; this is accompanied by an audio recording of Atwood reading the poem on the newspaper's website.

Recurring themes and cultural contexts

Theory of Canadian identity
Atwood's contributions to the theorizing of Canadian identity have garnered attention both in Canada and internationally. Her principal work of literary criticism, Survival: A Thematic Guide to Canadian Literature, is considered somewhat outdated, but remains a standard introduction to Canadian literature in Canadian studies programs internationally. Writer and academic Joseph Pivato has criticised the continued reprinting of Survival by Anansi Press as a view-narrowing disservice to students of Canadian literature.

In Survival, Atwood postulates that Canadian literature, and by extension Canadian identity, is characterized by the symbol of survival. This symbol is expressed in the omnipresent use of "victim positions" in Canadian literature. These positions represent a scale of self-consciousness and self-actualization for the victim in the "victor/victim" relationship. The "victor" in these scenarios may be other humans, nature, the wilderness or other external and internal factors which oppress the victim. Atwood's Survival bears the influence of Northrop Frye's theory of garrison mentality; Atwood uses Frye's concept of Canada's desire to wall itself off from outside influence as a critical tool to analyze Canadian literature. According to her theories in works such as Survival and her exploration of similar themes in her fiction, Atwood considers Canadian literature as the expression of Canadian identity. According to this literature, Canadian identity has been defined by a fear of nature, by settler history, and by unquestioned adherence to the community. In an interview with the Scottish critic Bill Findlay in 1979, Atwood discussed the relationship of Canadian writers and writing to the 'Imperial Cultures' of America and Britain.<ref>Findlay, Bill (1979), Interview with Margaret Atwood', in Bold, Christine (ed.), Cencrastus No. 1, Autumn 1979, pp. 2 - 6.</ref>

Atwood's contribution to the theorizing of Canada is not limited to her non-fiction works. Several of her works, including The Journals of Susanna Moodie, Alias Grace, The Blind Assassin and Surfacing, are examples of what postmodern literary theorist Linda Hutcheon calls "historiographic metafiction". In such works, Atwood explicitly explores the relation of history and narrative and the processes of creating history.

Among her contributions to Canadian literature, Atwood is a founding trustee of the Griffin Poetry Prize, as well as a founder of the Writers' Trust of Canada, a non-profit literary organization that seeks to encourage Canada's writing community.

Feminism
Atwood's work has been of interest to feminist literary critics, despite Atwood's unwillingness at times to apply the label feminist to her works. Starting with the publication of her first novel, The Edible Woman, Atwood asserted, "I don't consider it feminism; I just consider it social realism." Despite her rejection of the label at times, critics have analyzed the sexual politics, use of myth and fairytale, and gendered relationships in her work through the lens of feminism. Before the 1985 publication of The Handmaid's Tale Atwood gave an interview to feminist theorist Elizabeth Meese, in which she defined feminism as a 'belief in the rights of women' and averred that 'if practical, hardline, anti-male feminists took over and became the government, I would resist them.' In 2017, she clarified her discomfort with the label feminism by stating, "I always want to know what people mean by that word [feminism]. Some people mean it quite negatively, other people mean it very positively, some people mean it in a broad sense, other people mean it in a more specific sense. Therefore, in order to answer the question, you have to ask the person what they mean." Speaking to The Guardian, she said "For instance, some feminists have historically been against lipstick and letting transgender women into women's washrooms. Those are not positions I have agreed with", a position she repeated to The Irish Times.Phoebe Kirk, Why I Won't Call You A TERF, HuffPost (UK), May 18, 2018. In an interview with Penguin Books, Atwood stated that the driving question throughout her writing of The Handmaid's Tale was "If you were going to shove women back into the home and deprive them of all of these gains that they thought they had made, how would you do it?", but related this question to totalitarianism, not feminism.

In January 2018, Atwood penned the op-ed "Am I a Bad Feminist?" for The Globe and Mail. The piece was in response to social media backlash related to Atwood's signature on a 2016 petition calling for an independent investigation into the firing of Steven Galloway, a former University of British Columbia professor accused of sexual harassment and assault by a student. While feminist critics denounced Atwood for her support of Galloway, Atwood asserts that her signature was in support of due process in the legal system. She has been criticized for her comments surrounding the #MeToo movement, particularly that it is a "symptom of a broken legal system."

In 2018, following a partnership between Hulu's adaptation of The Handmaid's Tale and women's rights organisation Equality Now, Atwood was honored at their 2018 Make Equality Reality Gala. In her acceptance speech she said:

I am, of course, not a real activist—I'm simply a writer without a job who is frequently asked to speak about subjects that would get people with jobs fired if they themselves spoke. You, however, at Equality Now are real activists. I hope people will give Equality Now lots and lots of money, today, so they can write equal laws, enact equal laws and see that equal laws are implemented. That way, in time, all girls may be able to grow up believing that there are no avenues that are closed to them simply because they are girls.

In 2019, Atwood partnered with Equality Now for the release of The Testaments.

 Speculative and science fiction 
Atwood has resisted the suggestion that The Handmaid's Tale and Oryx and Crake are science fiction, suggesting to The Guardian in 2003 that they are speculative fiction instead: "Science fiction has monsters and spaceships; speculative fiction could really happen." She told the Book of the Month Club: "Oryx and Crake is a speculative fiction, not a science fiction proper. It contains no intergalactic space travel, no teleportation, no Martians." On BBC Breakfast, she explained that science fiction, as opposed to what she herself wrote, was "talking squids in outer space." The latter phrase particularly rankled advocates of science fiction and frequently recurs when her writing is discussed.

In 2005, Atwood said that she does at times write social science fiction and that The Handmaid's Tale and Oryx and Crake can be designated as such. She clarified her meaning on the difference between speculative and science fiction, admitting that others use the terms interchangeably: "For me, the science fiction label belongs on books with things in them that we can't yet do ... speculative fiction means a work that employs the means already to hand and that takes place on Planet Earth." She said that science fiction narratives give a writer the ability to explore themes in ways that realistic fiction cannot.

Atwood further clarified her definitions of terms in 2011, stating in response to a discussion with Ursula K. Le Guin that: "what Le Guin means by 'science fiction' is what I mean by 'speculative fiction', and what she means by 'fantasy' would include what I mean by 'science fiction'." She added that genre borders were increasingly fluid, and that all forms of "SF" might be placed under a common larger umbrella.

 Animal rights 
Atwood repeatedly makes observations about the relationship of humans to animals in her works. A large portion of the dystopia Atwood creates in Oryx and Crake rests upon the genetic modification and alteration of animals and humans, resulting in hybrids such as pigoons, rakunks, wolvogs, and Crakers, which function to raise questions on the limits and ethics of science and technology, as well as questions on what it means to be human.

In Surfacing, one character remarks about eating animals: "The animals die that we may live, they are substitute people ... And we eat them, out of cans or otherwise; we are eaters of death, dead Christ-flesh resurrecting inside us, granting us life." Some characters in her books link sexual oppression to meat-eating and consequently give up meat-eating. In The Edible Woman, Atwood's character Marian identifies with hunted animals and cries after hearing her fiancé's experience of hunting and eviscerating a rabbit. Marian stops eating meat but then later returns to it.

In Cat's Eye, the narrator recognizes the similarity between a turkey and a baby. She looks at "the turkey, which resembles a trussed, headless baby. It has thrown off its disguise as a meal and has revealed itself to me for what it is, a large dead bird." In Atwood's Surfacing, a dead heron represents purposeless killing and prompts thoughts about other senseless deaths.

Atwood is a pescetarian. In a 2009 interview she stated that "I shouldn't use the term vegetarian because I'm allowing myself gastropods, crustaceans and the occasional fish. Nothing with fur or feathers though".

 Political involvement 
Atwood has indicated in an interview that she considers herself a Red Tory in what she sees as the historical sense of the term, saying that "The Tories were the ones who believed that those in power had a responsibility to the community, that money should not be the measure of all things." Atwood also stated on Twitter that she is a monarchist. In the 2008 federal election, she attended a rally for the Bloc Québécois, a Quebec pro-independence party, because of her support for their position on the arts, and stated that she would vote for the party if she lived in Quebec and the choice was between the Bloc and the Conservatives. In an editorial in The Globe and Mail, she urged Canadians to vote for any other party other than the Conservatives to prevent them gaining a majority.

Atwood has strong views on environmental issues, and she and Graeme Gibson were the joint honorary presidents of the Rare Bird Club within BirdLife International. Atwood celebrated her 70th birthday at a gala dinner at Laurentian University in Sudbury, Ontario. She stated that she had chosen to attend the event because the city has been home to one of Canada's most ambitious environmental reclamation programs: "When people ask if there's hope (for the environment), I say, if Sudbury can do it, so can you. Having been a symbol of desolation, it's become a symbol of hope." Atwood has been chair of the Writers' Union of Canada and helped to found the Canadian English-Speaking chapter of PEN International, a group originally started to free politically imprisoned writers. She held the position of PEN Canada president in the mid 1980s and was the 2017 recipient of the PEN Center USA's Lifetime Achievement Award. Despite calls for a boycott by Gazan students, Atwood visited Israel and accepted the $1,000,000 Dan David Prize along with Indian author Amitav Ghosh at Tel Aviv University in May 2010. Atwood commented that "we don't do cultural boycotts."

In her dystopian novel The Handmaid's Tale (1985), all the developments take place near Boston in the United States, now known as Gilead, while Canada is portrayed as the only hope for an escape. To some this reflects her status of being "in the vanguard of Canadian anti-Americanism of the 1960s and 1970s". Critics have seen the mistreated Handmaid as Canada. During the debate in 1987 over a free-trade agreement between Canada and the United States, Atwood spoke out against the deal and wrote an essay opposing it. She said that the 2016 United States presidential election led to an increase in sales of The Handmaid's Tale. Amazon reported that The Handmaid's Tale was the most-read book of 2017.

 Activism 
In 2018, she signed an appeal of the American PEN Center in defense of Ukrainian director Oleg Sentsov, a political prisoner in Russia.

In July 2020, Atwood was one of the 153 signers of the "Harper's Letter" (also known as "A Letter on Justice and Open Debate") that expressed concern that "the free exchange of information and ideas, the lifeblood of a liberal society, is daily becoming more constricted."

On February 24, 2022, Atwood briefly covered the war in Ukraine at the time of the Russian invasion of Ukraine, and published a link to the state aid fund on Twitter. She continues to publish information about the war in Ukraine on the social network.

 Adaptations 
The novel Surfacing (1972) was adapted into a 1981 film, written by Bernard Gordon and directed by Claude Jutra. The film received poor reviews and suffers from making "little attempt to find cinematic equivalents for the admittedly difficult subjective and poetic dimensions of the novel."

The novel The Handmaid's Tale (1985) has been adapted several times. A 1990 film, directed by Volker Schlöndorff, with a screenplay by Harold Pinter, received mixed reviews. A musical adaptation resulted in the 2000 opera, written by Poul Ruders, with a libretto by Paul Bentley. It premiered at the Royal Danish Opera in 2000, and was staged in 2003 at London's English National Opera and the Minnesota Opera. Boston Lyric Opera mounted a production in May 2019. A television series by Bruce Miller began airing on the streaming service Hulu in 2017. The first season of the show earned eight Emmys in 2017, including Outstanding Drama Series. Season two premiered on April 25, 2018, and it was announced on May 2, 2018, that Hulu had renewed the series for a third season. Atwood appears in a cameo in the first episode as one of the Aunts at the Red Center. In 2019, a graphic novel based on this book and with the same title was published by Renée Nault, .

In 2003, six of Atwood's short stories were adapted by Shaftesbury Films for the anthology television series The Atwood Stories.

Atwood's 2008 Massey Lectures were adapted into the documentary Payback (2012), by director Jennifer Baichwal. Commentary by Atwood and others such as economist Raj Patel, ecologist William Reese, and religious scholar Karen Armstrong, are woven into various stories that explore the concepts of debt and payback, including an Armenian blood feud, agricultural working conditions, and the Deepwater Horizon oil spill.

The novel Alias Grace (1996) was adapted into a six-part 2017 miniseries directed by Mary Harron and adapted by Sarah Polley. It premiered on CBC on September 25, 2017, and the full series was released on Netflix on November 3, 2017. Atwood makes a cameo in the fourth episode of the series as a disapproving churchgoer.In the Wake of the Flood (released in October 2010), a documentary film by the Canadian director Ron Mann, followed Atwood on the unusual book tour for her novel The Year of the Flood (2009). During this innovative book tour, Atwood created a theatrical version of her novel, with performers borrowed from the local areas she was visiting. The documentary is described as "a fly-on-the-wall film vérité."

Atwood's children's book Wandering Wenda and Widow Wallop's Wunderground Washery (2011) was adapted into the children's television series The Wide World of Wandering Wenda, broadcast on CBC beginning in the spring of 2017. Aimed at early readers, the animated series follows Wenda and her friends as they navigate different adventures using words, sounds, and language.

Director Darren Aronofsky had been slated to direct an adaption of the MaddAddam trilogy for HBO, but it was revealed in October 2016 that HBO had dropped the plan from its schedule. In January 2018, it was announced that Paramount Television and Anonymous Content had bought the rights to the trilogy and would be moving forward without Aronofsky.

 Awards and honours 
Atwood holds numerous honorary degrees from various institutions, including The Sorbonne, NUI Galway as well as Oxford and Cambridge  universities.

 Awards

 Governor General's Award, 1966, 1985
 Companion of the Order of Canada, 1981
 Guggenheim fellowship, 1981
 Los Angeles Times Fiction Award, 1986
 American Humanist Association Humanist of the Year, 1987 
 Nebula Award, 1986 and Prometheus Award, 1987 nominations, both science fiction awards.
 Arthur C. Clarke Award for best Science Fiction, 1987
 Foreign Honorary Member of the American Academy of Arts and Sciences, 1988
 Canadian Booksellers Association Author of the Year, 1989
 Outstanding Canadian Award – Armenian Community Centre of Toronto, 1989
 Order of Ontario, 1990
 Trillium Book Award, 1991, 1993, 1995
 Government of France's Chevalier dans l'Ordre des Arts et des Lettres, 1994
 Helmerich Award, 1999, by the Tulsa Library Trust.
 Booker Prize, 2000, 2019
 Kenyon Review Award for Literary Achievement, 2007
 Prince of Asturias Award for Literature, 2008
 Fellow Royal Society of Literature, 2010
 Nelly Sachs Prize, Germany, 2010
 Dan David Prize, Israel, 2010
 Queen Elizabeth II Diamond Jubilee Medal, Canada, 2012
 Los Angeles Times Book Prize "Innovator's Award", 2012
 Gold medal of the Royal Canadian Geographical Society, 2015
 Golden Wreath of Struga Poetry Evenings, Macedonia, 2016
 Franz Kafka Prize, Czech Republic, 2017
 Peace Prize of the German Book Trade, Germany, 2017
 Companion of Honour, 2019
 Joint winner of the Booker Prize, 2019
 Dayton Literary Peace Prize, 2020
 British Academy President's Medal, 2020
 Emerson-Thoreau Medal (2020)
 Officer's Cross of the Order of Merit of the Federal Republic of Germany
 Hitchens Prize (2022)

 Honorary degrees

 Trent University, 1973
 Queen's University, 1974
 Concordia University, 1979
 Smith College, 1982
 University of Toronto, 1983
 University of Waterloo, 1985
 University of Guelph, 1985
 Mount Holyoke College, 1985
 Victoria College, 1987
 Université de Montréal, 1991
 University of Leeds, 1994
 McMaster University, 1996
 Lakehead University, 1998
 University of Oxford, 1998
 Algoma University, 2001
 University of Cambridge, 2001
 Dartmouth College, 2004
 Harvard University, 2004
 Université de la Sorbonne Nouvelle, 2005
 National University of Ireland, Galway, 2011
 Ryerson University, 2012
 Royal Military College of Canada (LLD), November 16, 2012
 University of Athens, 2013
 University of Edinburgh, 2014
 Universidad Autónoma de Madrid, 2017

 Works 
Summary Bibliography

 Novels 
 The Edible Woman (1969)
 Surfacing (1972)
 Lady Oracle (1976)
 Life Before Man (1979, finalist for the Governor General's Award)
 Bodily Harm (1981)
 The Handmaid's Tale (1985, winner of the 1987 Arthur C. Clarke Award and 1985 Governor General's Award, finalist for the 1986 Booker Prize)
 Cat's Eye (1988, finalist for the 1988 Governor General's Award and the 1989 Booker Prize)
 The Robber Bride (1993, finalist for the 1994 Governor General's Award and shortlisted for the James Tiptree Jr. Award)
 Alias Grace (1996, winner of the 1996 Giller Prize, finalist for the 1996 Booker Prize and the 1996 Governor General's Award, shortlisted for the 1997 Orange Prize for Fiction)
 The Blind Assassin (2000, winner of the 2000 Booker Prize and finalist for the 2000 Governor General's Award, shortlisted for the 2001 Orange Prize for Fiction.)
 Oryx and Crake (2003, finalist for the 2003 Booker Prize and the 2003 Governor General's Award and shortlisted for the 2004 Orange Prize for Fiction.)
 The Penelopiad (2005, nominated for the 2006 Mythopoeic Fantasy Award for Adult Literature and longlisted for the 2007 International Dublin Literary Award)
 The Year of the Flood (2009, Oryx and Crake companion, longlisted for the 2011 International Dublin Literary Award)
 MaddAddam (2013) (Third novel in Oryx and Crake trilogy)
 Scribbler Moon (written in 2014 as part of the Future Library project; will remain unpublished until 2114)
 The Heart Goes Last (2015)
 Hag-Seed (2016)
 The Testaments (2019, joint winner of the 2019 Booker Prize)

Short fiction collections 
 Dancing Girls (1977, winner of the St. Lawrence Award for Fiction and the award of The Periodical Distributors of Canada for Short Fiction)
 Murder in the Dark (1983)
 Bluebeard's Egg (1983)
 Wilderness Tips (1991, finalist for the Governor General's Award)
 Good Bones (1992)
 Good Bones and Simple Murders (1994)
 The Labrador Fiasco (1996)
 The Tent (2006)
 Moral Disorder (2006)
 Stone Mattress (2014)
 Old Babes in the Wood (2023)

Poetry collections 
 Double Persephone (1961)
 The Circle Game (1964, winner of the 1966 Governor General's Award)
 Expeditions (1965)
 Speeches for Doctor Frankenstein (1966)
 The Animals in That Country (1968)
 The Journals of Susanna Moodie (1970)
 Procedures for Underground (1970)
 Power Politics (1971)
 You Are Happy (1974) Includes the poem Song of the Worms Selected Poems (1976)
 Two-Headed Poems (1978)
 True Stories (1981)
 Love Songs of a Terminator (1983)
 Snake Poems (1983)
 Interlunar (1984)
 Selected Poems 1966–1984 (Canada)
 Selected Poems II: 1976–1986 (US)
 Morning in the Burned House, McClelland & Stewart (1995)
 Eating Fire: Selected Poems, 1965–1995 (UK,1998)
 "You Begin." (1978) – as recited by Margaret Atwood; included in all three most recent editions of her "Selected Poems" as listed above (US, CA, UK)
 The Door (2007)
 Dearly (2020)

E-books 
 I'm Starved For You: Positron, Episode One (2012)
 Choke Collar: Positron, Episode Two (2012)
 Erase Me: Positron, Episode Three (2013)
 The Heart Goes Last: Positron, Episode Four (2013)
 The Happy Zombie Sunrise Home (2013) (with Naomi Alderman)
 My Evil Mother (2022)

Anthologies edited 
 The New Oxford Book of Canadian Verse (1982)
 The Canlit Foodbook (1987)
 The Oxford Book of Canadian Short Stories in English (1988)
 The Best American Short Stories 1989 (1989) (with Shannon Ravenel)
 The New Oxford Book of Canadian Short Stories in English (1995)

 Children's books 
 Up in the Tree (1978)
 Anna's Pet (1980) (with Joyce C. Barkhouse)
 For the Birds (1990) (with Shelly Tanaka)
 Princess Prunella and the Purple Peanut (1995)
 Rude Ramsay and the Roaring Radishes (2003)
 Bashful Bob and Doleful Dorinda (2006)
 Wandering Wenda and Widow Wallop's Wunderground Washery (2011); inspired a cartoon series called Wandering Wenda in 2016.

 Non-fiction 
 Survival: A Thematic Guide to Canadian Literature (1972)
 Days of the Rebels 1815–1840 (1977)
 Second Words: Selected Critical Prose (1982)
 Through the One-Way Mirror (1986)
 Strange Things: The Malevolent North in Canadian Literature (1995)
 Negotiating with the Dead: A Writer on Writing (2002)
 Moving Targets: Writing with Intent, 1982–2004 (2004)
 Writing with Intent: Essays, Reviews, Personal Prose 1983–2005 (2005)
 Payback: Debt and the Shadow Side of Wealth (2008)
 In Other Worlds: SF and the Human Imagination (2011)
 On Writers and Writing (2015)
 Burning Questions: Essays & Occasional Pieces 2004-2021 (2022)

Drawings 
 Kanadian Kultchur Komix featuring "Survivalwoman" in This Magazine under the pseudonym, Bart Gerrard 1975–1980
 Others appear on her website.

Graphic novels 
 Angel Catbird, with Johnnie Christmas and Tamra Bonvillain (2016)
 War Bears, with Ken Steacy (2018)

 Television scripts 
 The Servant Girl (1974)
 Snowbird (1981)
 Heaven on Earth (1987)

 Libretti 
 The Trumpets of Summer (1964) (with composer John Beckwith)
 Frankenstein Monster Song (2004, with rock band One Ring Zero)
 "Pauline", a chamber opera in two acts, with composer Tobin Stokes for City Opera Vancouver (2014)

Audio recordings 
 The Poetry and Voice of Margaret Atwood (1977)
 Margaret Atwood Reads "Unearthing Suite" (1985)
 Margaret Atwood Reading From Her Poems (2005)
 Margaret Atwood as herself in Zombies, Run, as a surviving radio operator in themes.

Filmography
 She is credited as playing herself in all 26 episodes of The Wide World of Wandering Wenda in which she wears funny hats to match the various themes (2017)

See also
 Southern Ontario Gothic
 Canadian poetry
 List of Canadian poets
 List of Canadian writers

 References 

 Further reading 
 
 
 Clements, Pam. "Margaret Atwood and Chaucer: Truth and Lies," in: Cahier Calin: Makers of the Middle Ages. Essays in Honor of William Calin, ed. Richard Utz and Elizabeth Emery (Kalamazoo, MI: Studies in Medievalism, 2011), pp. 39–41.
 
 
 Findlay, Bill (1979), Interview with Margaret Atwood, in Cencrastus No. 1, Autumn 1979, pp. 2 – 6 .
 
 
 
Miceli, Barbara. "Margaret Atwood's The Heart goes Last: Panopticism, Discipline, Society, and Ustopia" in Metacritic Journal for Comparative Studies and Theory 5.2 (December 2019), pp. 79–90.
Miceli, Barbara. "Religion, Gender Inequality, and Surrogate Motherhood in Margaret Atwood's The Handmaid's Tale", in CoSMo (Comparative Studies in Modernism), n° 12 (2018), pp. 95–108.
 
 
 
 
 
 
 
 
 
 
 

 External links 

 
 Margaret Atwood Society official website
 
 
 Profile of Margaret Atwood by The Guardian''
 Interview of Margaret Atwood by The Forum on BBC World Service
 

 
1939 births
20th-century Canadian novelists
20th-century Canadian poets
20th-century Canadian short story writers
20th-century Canadian women writers
21st-century Canadian novelists
21st-century Canadian poets
21st-century Canadian short story writers
21st-century Canadian women writers
Booker Prize winners
Canadian agnostics
Canadian environmentalists
Canadian feminist writers
Canadian humanists
Canadian literary critics
Canadian Members of the Order of the Companions of Honour
Canadian science fiction writers
Canadian Screen Award winners
Canadian women academics
Canadian women environmentalists
Canadian women non-fiction writers
Canadian women novelists
Canadian women poets
Canadian women short story writers
Companions of the Order of Canada
Academic staff of Concordia University
Fellows of the American Academy of Arts and Sciences
Fellows of the Royal Society of Canada
Fellows of the Royal Society of Literature
Governor General's Award-winning fiction writers
Governor General's Award-winning poets
Harbourfront Festival Prize winners
Literary critics of English
Living people
Members of the Order of Ontario
New York University faculty
People from Essex County, Ontario
People from Simcoe County
Postmodern feminists
Postmodern writers
Radcliffe College alumni
Recipients of Princess of Asturias Awards
Academic staff of Sir George Williams University
Struga Poetry Evenings Golden Wreath laureates
Academic staff of the University of Alberta
Academic staff of the University of British Columbia
University of Toronto alumni
Women inventors
Women literary critics
Women science fiction and fantasy writers
Writers from Ottawa
Writers from Toronto
Academic staff of York University